The District Council of Loxton Waikerie is a local government area in the Murray Mallee region of South Australia. The council seat lies at Loxton, while it maintains a branch office at Waikerie.

The council was formed on 3 May 1997 as an amalgamation of the District Council of Brown's Well, the District Council of Loxton and the District Council of Waikerie.

It includes the towns and localities of Alawoona, Boolgun, Bakara Well, Billiatt, Bookpurnong,  Bugle Hut, Caliph, Devlins Pound, Golden Heights, Good Hope Landing,  Holder, Holder Siding, Kanni, Kingston On Murray, Kringin, Loxton, Loxton North, Lowbank, Maggea, Malpas, Markaranka, Meribah, Moorook, Moorook South, Naidia, New Residence, New Well, Notts Well, Paisley, Paruna, Pata, Peebinga, Pooginook, Pyap, Pyap West, Qualco, Ramco, Ramco Heights, Schell Well, Stockyard Plain, Sunlands, Taldra,  Taplan, Taylorville, Taylorville Station, Veitch, Waikerie, Wappilka, Wigley Flat, Woodleigh, Woolpunda, Wunkar and  Yinkanie, and parts of Galga, Mantung, Mercunda, Murbko and Westons Flat.

Councillors

The District Council of Loxton Waikerie has a directly-elected mayor.

References

External links 
 Council website

Loxton Waikerie, District Council of
Riverland